Panampatta is a place situated near Pathanapuram in Kollam District, Kerala state, India.

Panampatta included in the Pidavoor Village.

Politics
Panampatta is a part of Pathanapuram assembly constituency in Mavelikkara (Lok Sabha constituency). Shri. K. B. Ganesh Kumar is the current MLA of Pathanpuram. Shri.Kodikkunnil Suresh is the current member of parliament of Mavelikkara.

Geography
Panampatta is a small village in Thalavoor panchayat. Panampatta is junction in Pathanapuram-Kottarakkara road. It connects places Karyara, etc. Vellangadu bridge is a main landmark of Panampatta. Panampatta Akshaya Centre situated near Vellangadu Jn.

References

Geography of Kollam district